Aránzazu Isabel María "Arantxa" Sánchez Vicario (born 18 December 1971) is a Spanish former world No. 1 tennis player in both singles and doubles. She won 14 Grand Slam titles: four in singles, six in women's doubles, and four in mixed doubles. She also won four Olympic medals and five Fed Cup titles representing Spain. In 1994, she was crowned the ITF World Champion for the year.

Career
Arantxa Sánchez Vicario started playing tennis at the age of four, when she followed her older brothers Emilio Sánchez and Javier Sánchez (both of whom became professional players) to the court and hit balls against the wall with her first racquet. As a 17-year-old, she became the youngest winner of the women's singles title at the 1989 French Open, defeating World No. 1 Steffi Graf in the final. (Monica Seles broke the record the following year when she won the title at age 16.)

Sánchez Vicario quickly developed a reputation on the tour for her tenacity and refusal to concede a point. Commentator Bud Collins described her as "unceasing in determined pursuit of tennis balls, none seeming too distant to be retrieved in some manner and returned again and again to demoralize opponents" and nicknamed her the "Barcelona Bumblebee".

She won six women's doubles Grand Slam titles, including the US Open in 1993 (with Helena Suková) and Wimbledon in 1995 (with Jana Novotná). She also won four Grand Slam mixed doubles titles. In 1991, she helped Spain win its first-ever Fed Cup title, and helped Spain win the Fed Cup in 1993, 1994, 1995, and 1998. Sanchez Vicario holds the records for the most matches won by a player in Fed Cup competition (72) and for most ties played (58). She was ITF world champion in 1994 in singles.

Sánchez Vicario was also a member of the Spanish teams that won the Hopman Cup in 1990 and 2002.

Over the course of her career, Sánchez Vicario won 29 singles titles and 69 doubles titles before retiring in November 2002. She came out of retirement in 2004 to play doubles in a few select tournaments as well as the 2004 Summer Olympics, where she became the only tennis player to play in five Olympics in the Games history. Sanchez Vicario was the most decorated Olympian in Spanish history with four medals – two silver and two bronze.  Her medal count has since been surpassed by David Cal and Saul Craviotto with five medals each.

In 2005, TENNIS Magazine ranked her in 27th place in its list of 40 Greatest Players of the TENNIS era and in 2007, she was inducted into the International Tennis Hall of Fame. She was only the third Spanish player (and the first Spanish woman) to be inducted.

In 2009, Sánchez Vicario was present at the opening ceremony of Madrid's Caja Mágica, the new venue for the Madrid Masters. The second show court is named Court Arantxa Sánchez Vicario in her honour.

In 2015, Sanchez Vicario went into professional coaching. She got involved in training Danish player Caroline Wozniacki.

Personal life
She has been married twice: her first marriage to the sports writer Juan Vehils in July 2000 ended in 2001. She then married businessman Josep Santacana in September 2008, with whom she has a daughter (born 2009) and son (born 2011). In 2019, Sánchez Vicario and Santacana divorced.

In 2012, Sánchez Vicario published an autobiography in which she claimed that, despite having earned $60 million over the course of her career, her parents had exerted almost total control over her finances and lost all of her money. The same year, Sánchez Vicario sued her father and older brother Javier for the alleged mishandling of her career earnings. The court case continued over three years, and in 2015 concluded in a private settlement.

She has faced multiple court proceedings relating to charges of tax evasion and fraud. In 2009, Sánchez Vicario was found guilty of tax evasion and ordered to repay €3.5 million. In 2015, Banque de Luxembourg successfully filed complaint against her for credit and property fraud amounting to $5.2 million, however they were unable to recoup it. In 2018, Sánchez Vicario was once again charged with fraud, for deliberately misleading the courts on her financial set-up during the previous case. As of 2021, Barcelona prosecutors are seeking a four-year jail term for Sánchez Vicario, due to further allegations of fraud relating to the transfer of assets to avoid paying her debts from a previous lawsuit.

As well as tennis-playing siblings Javier and Emilio, Sanchez Vicario also has an older sister – Marisa – who briefly played professional tennis, peaking at world no. 368 in 1990.

Major finals

Grand Slam finals

Singles: 12 (4 titles, 8 runner–ups)

Women's doubles: 11 (6 titles, 5 runner–ups)

Mixed doubles: 8 (4 titles, 4 runner–ups)

Olympics

Singles: 2 medals (1 silver medal, 1 bronze medal)

Arantxa Sánchez Vicario lost in the semi-finals to Jennifer Capriati 3–6, 6–3, 1–6. In 1992, there was no bronze medal play-off match, both beaten semi-final players received bronze medals

Women's doubles: 2 medals (1 silver medal, 1 bronze medal)

Year-end championships finals

Singles: 1 (1 runner–up)

Doubles: 6 (2 titles, 4 runner–ups)

WTA career finals

Singles: 77 (29–48)

Doubles: 111 (69–42)

Grand Slam performance timelines

Singles

Doubles

WTA Tour career earnings

 * as of 17 January 2010

Head-to-head vs. top 10 ranked players

See also

 WTA Awards
 World number one women tennis players

Notes

References

External links

 
 
 
 
  sportec.com: Tax evasion issue of Arantxa Sanchez Vicario
 Arantxa Sanchez Vicario's induction speech to the Hall of Fame
 Golden Heart Award 1997 granted by Spanish Heart Foundation

1971 births
Australian Open (tennis) champions
Sportswomen from Catalonia
French Open champions
Hopman Cup competitors
International Tennis Hall of Fame inductees
Living people
Olympic bronze medalists for Spain
Olympic silver medalists for Spain
Olympic medalists in tennis
Olympic tennis players of Spain
Spanish female tennis players
Tennis players from Barcelona
Tennis players at the 1988 Summer Olympics
Tennis players at the 1992 Summer Olympics
Tennis players at the 1996 Summer Olympics
Tennis players at the 2000 Summer Olympics
Tennis players at the 2004 Summer Olympics
US Open (tennis) champions
Wimbledon champions
Tennis commentators
Grand Slam (tennis) champions in women's singles
Grand Slam (tennis) champions in women's doubles
Grand Slam (tennis) champions in mixed doubles
Medalists at the 1992 Summer Olympics
Medalists at the 1996 Summer Olympics
Spanish tennis coaches
WTA number 1 ranked singles tennis players
WTA number 1 ranked doubles tennis players
ITF World Champions